Thioxanthone is a heterocyclic compound that is a sulfur analog of xanthone.

Thioxanthone can be prepared by the reaction of diphenyl sulfide with phosgene in the presence of catalytic aluminium chloride. This synthesis can be seen as a special case of the Friedel-Crafts acylation.  The reduction product is thioxanthene.

Thioxanthone dissolves in concentrated sulfuric acid to give a yellow colored liquid with intense green fluorescence. A mixture of the thioxanthone derivatives of 2- and 4-isopropylthioxanthone (ITX) is used in the printing industry.  Pharmaceutical drugs that are derivatives of thioxanthone include hycanthone and lucanthone.

References

External links